Prince Alexander Nikolayevich Golitsyn (December 19, 1773 – December 4, 1844) was a statesman of the Russian Empire, in 1803–1816 he served as Chief Prosecutor, and in 1816–1824 he served as Minister of Education, an Active Privy Councilor of the 1st Class (1841). The confidant of Alexander I, who until the end of his life treasured him with "closeness and advice".

Origin and youth

The only son of the captain of the guard, Prince Nikolai Sergeyevich Golitsyn (Alekseevich line), from his third marriage with Alexandra Alexandrovna Khitrovo (1736–1796), the grandson of the Moscow governor Sergei Alekseevich Golitsyn (1695–1758). Widowed two weeks after the birth of her son, the mother in 1776 married retired Major Mikhail Kologrivov. She treated her son strictly and coldly, but the influential court lady Marya Perekusikhina fell in love with the "funny and pungent" boy and, by order of Catherine II, in 1783 he was enrolled in the Page Corps moving from Moscow to Saint Petersburg.

The main focus was on teaching secular communication, French, fencing, dancing and horseback riding.

Thus, from infancy, Prince Golitsyn had access to the courtyard, where at first it was valued as a participant in the children's games of the Grand Dukes – Alexander and Constantine, and then – as a witty and clever gentleman. His brother (by father) Mikhail Golitsyn, who took the place of the Yaroslavl governor, built the estate of Karabikha (now a museum-reserve) under the city.

Another brother (by mother), Dmitry Kologrivov, accompanied the undersized prince Golitsyn in his mischief. Both brothers very skillfully imitated the manners and reprimand of others. Count Fyodor Tolstoy wrote:

Career
After graduating from the Page Corps in 1794, he was received as the lieutenant in the Preobrazhensky Regiment. But a year later he returned to the court and became a chamber junker of the small court of Grand Duke Alexander Pavlovich, and in 1796 he was transferred to the large imperial court. In 1799 he received the rank of chamberlain and in the same year became commander of the Order of Saint John of Jerusalem. He was expelled from Saint Petersburg by Emperor Paul I in the same year for an unknown reason.

After the accession to the throne of Alexander I, Prince Golitsyn, as a person close to him, was appointed first as Chief Prosecutor of the I and later III Departments of the Senate, and then on October 21, 1803, at the insistence of the emperor, assumed the post of Chief Prosecutor of the Holy Synod. In 1810, while maintaining his former position, he became the head of the foreign confessions, in 1816 – the Minister of Education.

Partly under the influence of Rodion Koshelev, this Epicurean and Volterian of Catherine's training, elected in 1806 as a member of the Russian Academy, turned to piety with a pronounced sentimental-mystical color. He easily undertook to explain to the emperor the most complex theological questions, although he knew the history of religion superficially and considered true Christianity "foggy sentimental pietism mixed with Orthodox dogmas, various heretical and sectarian teachings". Moscow Metropolitan Philaret recalled:

Having proclaimed piety as the foundation of true enlightenment, Golitsyn headed for the clericalization of education, which under his leadership was zealously pursued by Mikhail Magnitsky and Dmitry Runich. He was suspicious of contemporary literature, which was expressed in the extreme censorship.

After in 1817 the departments of spiritual affairs and public education were merged into one ministry – the Ministry of Spiritual Affairs and Public Education – Golitsyn became the head of the latter, but was relieved of the post of Chief Prosecutor. Since 1810, Alexander Golitsyn was a member of the Council of State, and during 1839–1841 – Chairman of General Meetings. He was one of the few to whom the secret of the abdication of Konstantin Pavlovich was entrusted. He headed the Philanthropic Society, took part in the organization of the Guardians of Prisons Society and other philanthropic endeavors.

In addition to the reform of theological schools, the establishment of the Russian Bible Society took place under Prince Golitsyn, which, under the presidency of the prince, translated the Bible into Russian and distributed more than 400,000 copies of it. The employees of this society, Popov, Magnitsky, Runich, and Cavelin, were appointed by Golitsyn to direct higher education, where they instilled clericalism; many professors were fired for lack of piety. Magnitsky demanded to completely close Kazan University ward to him. Although it was customary to associate the triumph of reaction with finding Golitsyn at the helm of the ministry, it was with him that the Saint Petersburg University and the Richelieu Lyceum were established.

On August 9, 1821, the Russian Emperor Alexander I established the Siberian Committee and Count Golitsin was included in its first composition.

To neutralize the influence of Alexander Golitsyn on the emperor, Aleksey Arakcheev led an intrigue under him with the participation of Metropolitan Seraphim and Archimandrite Photius, who convinced Alexander I that Golitsyn's administration was detrimental to the church and the state. His enemies triumphed on May 27, 1824, when Prince Golitsyn was to resign in both departments, retaining only the title of chief over the postal department. He held the last post under Nicholas I, who valued in Golitsyn "the most faithful friend of his family". Over the years, his religiosity only intensified. A contemporary recalls:

In 1843, Count Golitsyn, due to visual impairment, left the capital and retired to Crimea, where he died in his estate of Gaspra. In the same Golitsyn Palace, Leo Tolstoy later wrote the novel "Hadji Murad". He was buried in the Balaklava Saint George Monastery.

Personal life
Golitsyn spent his whole life a bachelor and was known for his intimate relationships with men. Nikolai Yazykov in a letter of 1824 cites an anecdote, "as if the sovereign had called for the famous sodomite Bantysh-Kamensky and ordered him to compile a list of all his acquaintances on this part, that Bantysh-Kamensky presented him with such a list, starting with the Minister of Education, then there was the chancellor and so on... After that he had an audience with the emperor and certified him oath in the truth of his report". Alexander Pushkin ridiculed Golitsyn in the epigram "Here is the Tail Protector...". The famous memoirist and homosexual Philip Vigel recalls Golitsyn even more biasedly: "Without blushing, you can't talk about him, I won't say anything more: I'm not going to stain these pages with his stupidity, his baseness and vices".

Proceedings
Prince Alexander Golitsyn compiled for Empress Elizabeth Alekseevna "Opinion on the Difference Between the Eastern and Western Churches, with the History of Their Separation", which was published only in 1870.

Awards and honors

Russian
 1799 – Order of Saint John of Jerusalem, Commander's Cross;
 1804 — Order of Saint Anne, 1st Class;
 1814 — Order of Saint Alexander Nevsky;
 1826 — Order of Saint Vladimir, 1st Class;
 1826 — Order of the Holy Apostle Andrew the First-Called;
 1826 – Diamond to the Order of the Holy Apostle Andrew the First-Called;
 1830 – Chancellor of Russian Orders;
 1831 — Order of the White Eagle;
 1831 — Order of Saint Stanislaus, 1st Class;
 1834 – Portrait of the Emperor Sovereign with Diamonds;
 1838 – Badge "For XL Years of Immaculate Service";
 1842 – Pension According to the Order of the Holy Apostle Andrew the First-Called.

Foreign
 1842 — Order of the Black Eagle (Prussia).

References

Sources
Fedorov. Golitsyn // Orthodox Encyclopedia – Moscow: Church and Scientific Center "Orthodox Encyclopedia", 2006 – Volume XI – Pages 695–697 – 752 pages – 39,000 copies – 
Vladimir Sheremetevsky. Golitsyn Alexander Nikolaevich // Russian Biographical Dictionary: Gogol – Gune. Moscow, 1997. Pages 76–136. 
Yuri Bartenev. From the Notes of Yuri Bartenev. Stories of Prince Alexander Nikolayevich Golitsyn // Russian Archive, 1886 – Book 3 – Issue 6 – Pages 305–333
Alexander Golitsyn. (Letters to Archimandrite Photius) / Publication and Сomments by Nikolai Barsov // Russian Antiquity, 1882 – Volume 33 – No. 3 – Pages 765–780 – Under the Title: Prince Alexander Golitsyn and Archimandrite Photius in 1822–1825
Alexander Golitsyn. Two Letters of the Minister of Public Education, Prince Alexander Golitsyn, to the director of the Tsarsko-Rural Lyceum, Yegor Engelhart // Russian Archive, 1868 – 2nd edition – Moscow, 1869 – Columns 873–877
Alexander Golitsyn. Letters from Prince Alexander Nikolayevich Golitsyn to Countess Anna Alekseevna Orlova-Chesmenskaya in 1822 and 1823 / Message by Ivan Zvegintsev // Russian Archive, 1869 – Issue 6 – Columns 943–958
Alexander Golitsyn. Conversation of Napoleon I with Prince Alexander Golitsyn. 1808 / Written by Nikolai Kicheev // Russian Antiquity, 1874 – Volume 10 – No. 7 – Pages 621–622
Yuri Kondakov. The Resignation of Prince Alexander Golitsyn on May 15, 1824 // Russia in the Nineteenth Century: Politics, Economics, Culture – Saint Petersburg, 1996
Yuri Kondakov. The Personality and Government Activities of Prince Alexander Golitsyn // Personality and Power in the History of Russia in the 19th and 20th Centuries – Saint Petersburg, 1997
Yuri Kondakov. Prince Alexander Golitsyn: Courtier, Official, Christian: Monograph – Saint Petersburg: ElekSis LLC, 2014 – 284 Pages
Evgenia Nazarenko. Prince Alexander Golitsyn in the Socio-Political and Religious History of Russia in the First Half of the 19th Century: a Monograph – Voronezh: Publishing House of Voronezh State University, 2014 – 188 Pages
Natalia Zazulina. Prince Alexander Golitsyn. Unknown in All Respects – Moscow: Boslen, 2019. 288 Pages.

External links
Profile of Alexander Nikolayevich Golitsyn on the official website of the Russian Academy of Sciences

1773 births
1844 deaths
Recipients of the Order of St. Vladimir, 1st class
Recipients of the Order of the White Eagle (Russia)
Recipients of the Order of St. Anna, 1st class
Recipients of the Order of Saint Stanislaus (Russian), 1st class
Golitsyn family
Members of the State Council (Russian Empire)
Members of the Russian Academy
Russian princes